Microsoft Office 2019 (Second perpetual release of Office 16) is a version of Microsoft Office for both Windows and Mac. It replaces Office 2016 and was replaced by Office 2021 on October 5, 2021. It was unveiled on April 27, 2018 for Windows 10 and June 12, 2018 for macOS, and launched on September 24, 2018. Some features that had previously been restricted to Office 365 subscribers are available in this release. Office 2019 remain same major version 16 as predecessor Office 2016, therefore it is second perpetual release of Office 16. Microsoft plans to end mainstream support for Office 2019 on October 10, 2023. Unlike other versions of Microsoft Office, Office 2019 will only get two years of extended support, which means that support for Office 2019 will end on the same day as support for Office 2016 and Windows 10, on October 14, 2025.

History 

On April 27, 2018, Microsoft released Office 2019 complete v Commercial Preview version for Windows 10. On June 12, 2018, Microsoft released a complete preview for mac os

New features

Office 2019 includes many of the features previously published via Office 365, along with improved inking features, LaTeX support in Word, new animation features in PowerPoint including the morph and zoom features, and new formulas and charts in Excel for data analysis.

OneNote is absent from the suite as the Universal Windows Platform (UWP) version of OneNote bundled with Windows 10 replaces it. OneNote 2016 can be installed as an optional feature on the Office Installer.

For Mac users, Focus Mode will be brought to Word, 2D maps will be brought to Excel and new Morph transitions, SVG support and 4K video exports will be coming to PowerPoint, among other features.

Despite being released in the same month, the new Office user interface in Word, Excel, PowerPoint, and Outlook is only available to Office 365 subscribers, not perpetual Office 2019 licenses.

Editions

Traditional editions
Same as its predecessor Microsoft Office 2016, Microsoft Office 2019 has the same perpetual SKU editions aimed towards different markets. Like its predecessor, Microsoft Office 2019 contains Word, Excel, PowerPoint and OneNote and is licensed for use on one computer.

5 perpetual SKU editions of Office 2019 were released for Windows:
 Home & Student: This retail suite includes the core applications only – Word, Excel, PowerPoint, OneNote.
 Home & Business: This retail suite includes the core applications and Outlook.
 Standard: This suite, only available through volume licensing channels, includes the core applications, as well as Outlook and Publisher.
 Professional: This retail suite includes the core applications, as well as Outlook, Publisher, and Access.
 Professional Plus: This suite includes the core applications, as well as Outlook, Publisher, Access, and Skype for Business. This edition is available through retail channels (Developer tools subscription like MSDN subscription & Visual Studio subscription）and volume licensing channels.

Unlike its predecessor, both Windows version retail & volume versions use the Click-to-Run (C2R) for installation. Also unlike its predecessor, all Windows version Office 2019 require only Windows 10 and Windows Server 2019.

Like its predecessor, three traditional editions of Office 2019 were released for Mac (macOS Sierra or later):
 Home & Student: This retail suite includes the core applications only.
 Home & Business: This retail suite includes the core applications and Outlook.
 Standard: This suite, only available through volume licensing channels, includes the core applications and Outlook.

Deployment
Office 2019 requires Windows 10, Windows Server 2019 or macOS Mojave and later. macOS installations can be acquired from the Microsoft website or the Mac App Store.

For Office 2013 and 2016, various editions containing the client apps were available in both Click-To-Run (inspired by Microsoft App-V) and traditional Windows Installer setup formats. However, Office 2019 client apps only have a Click-to-Run installer and only the server apps have the traditional MSI installer. The Click-To-Run version has a smaller footprint; in case of Microsoft Office 2019 Pro Plus, the product requires 10 GB less than the MSI version of Office 2016 Pro Plus.

Volume licensing versions of Office 2019 cannot be downloaded from Microsoft Volume Licensing Service Center and must be deployed using configuration.xml and running Office Deployment Tool (ODT) from command-line.

macOS Support

All releases are available for download in the Update history for Office for Mac (and Update history for Office 2016 for Mac)

See also
 List of office suites
 List of typefaces included with Microsoft Windows (list of Office Cloud fonts continues in footnote)

References

2018 software
2019
Office 2019
Office suites for Windows